Chile Chico (Spanish for  Little Chile) is a town in General Carrera Province, Aisén Region, Patagonia, Chile. It is located on the south shore of General Carrera Lake. Chile Chico, which has around 3,000 inhabitants, is the eponymous capital of the commune and capital of the General Carrera Province of the Aysén Region.

A car ferry connects the town with Puerto Ingeniero Ibáñez on the north shore of the lake.

Since 2017 Chico Chico has produced the World's southernmost wine. This wine is produced at the experimental vineyard of Undurraga that is part of Instituto de Investigación Agropecuaria.

Climate
Its rain shadow location gives Chile Chico a mediterranean climate (Köppen: Csb), unusually dry for its latitude with only half the rainfall of Balmaceda nearby and less than a tenth that received at many coastal locations in the Aisén region. Its moderate climate is sometimes compared to Middle Chile but is most similar to that of places like Sequim which lie in a similar westerly wind rain shadow.

Demographics
Of these, 3,042 (68.5%) lived in urban areas and 1,402 (31.5%) in rural areas. The population grew by 18.3% (687 persons) between the 1992 and 2002 censuses.

Administration
As a commune, Chile Chico is a third-level administrative division of Chile administered by a municipal council, headed by an alcalde who is directly elected every four years. The 2008-2012 alcalde is Luperciano Muñoz González (PPD).

Within the electoral divisions of Chile, Chile Chico is represented in the Chamber of Deputies by René Alinco (PDC) and David Sandoval (UDI) as part of the 59th electoral district, which includes the entire Aisén Region. The commune is represented in the Senate by Antonio Horvath Kiss (RN) and Patricio Walker Prieto (PDC) as part of the 18th senatorial constituency (Aisén Region).

References

External links
  Municipality of Chile Chico

Communes of Chile
Populated lakeshore places in Chile
Populated places established in 1929
Populated places in General Carrera Province
Capitals of Chilean provinces